Vincent Castellanos (born February 7, 1961) is an American actor. Castellanos is best known for his roles as Mateo in the adventure-horror film Anaconda and Spider Monkey in The Crow: City of Angels.

Filmography 
The Crow: City of Angels (1996) - Spider Monkey
On Seventh Avenue (1996) (TV) - Tito
Anaconda (1997) - Mateo
K-911 (1999) (video) - Harry Stripe
The Last Marshal (1999) - Torres
The Disciples (2000) (TV) - Felix
Lost in the Pershing Point Hotel (2000) - Toothpick Jorge
Primary Suspect (2000) - Reuben
Mulholland Drive (2001) - Ed
Amy's Orgasm (2001) - Hans
Room 101 (2001) - Bill
The Master of Disguise (2002) - Art Dealer
The Street King (2002) - Palacios
Fascination (2004) - District Attorney
Eulogy (2004) - Adult Film Actor
Twin Peaks (2017) (TV) - Federico

External links
 

American male film actors
American male television actors
1961 births
Living people
Cuban emigrants to the United States